401 Squadron or 401st Squadron may refer to:

 401 Tactical Fighter Squadron, Canada
 401 Squadron (Portugal)
 401st Tactical Airlift Squadron (JASDF), Japan
 401st Aero Squadron, Air Service, United States Army, see list of American aero squadrons
 401st Bombardment Squadron, United States Air Force
 401st Fighter Squadron, United States Air Force
 VMFT-401, United States Marine Corps